Jacques Van Herp (26 November 1923 – 30 December 2004) was a Belgian publisher, anthologist, science fiction writer and director of collections at Marabout.

Biography
He initially taught as a mathematics teacher in secondary education in Brussels. He then became director of collections at the Marabout publishing house and specialized in publishing novels written by European forerunners of science fiction, being awarded in 1976 with the Special Prize for Belgium of the European Science Fiction Society.

His anticipation novels were published under several pseudonyms:

 With his only signature: Marc Monnier, Alain Arvel, André Jouly, Michel Berchamps, Carlo Nada, Alan Haigh, Michel Vedewe, Alain Provist, Ladislas Céteski, Illy Kenkönnery, Michel Berchmans, Michel Védéwé.
 Under a collective signature: Michel Jansen, Michel Goissert.

Critical appraisals
Van Herp considered that the countries of the Eastern Bloc had notable anticipatory writers like Stanisław Lem, Ivan Yefremov, the Strugatsky brothers and Valentina Zhuravlyova; but he said  "crushed" all of them. After reading Fărcășan's novel , Van Herp considered the author to be the size of Robert A. Heinlein, Arthur C. Clarke, and Fredric Brown, stating that in Fărcășan's work he saw the logical rigor in extrapolating of the first, the high knowledge of the second, and the cosmic sense as well as the humor of the third. "The comparison seems formidable," Van Herp acknowledged, "but Fărcășan supports it very well (...)".

Works

As Alan Haigh 
 La Porte des ténèbres (Le Masque Fantastique, n° 18, 1977, coll. rouge)

As Alain Arvel 
 La Capricieuse, Alsatia, Signe de Piste, 1958
 Xavier la dérive, Signe de Piste 128, 1986
 Lucky, mon ami, Fleurus, 1995, coll. Signe de Piste
 Thierry tête de fer, Spès, 1954, coll. Jamboree
 Le Roi Mezel (in collaboration with Jean-Claude Alain), Spès, 1954, coll. Jamboree
 Le linceul de pourpre, Spès, 1956, coll. Jamboree
 Terre des Ombres, Spès, 1957, coll. Jamboree
 Cap au Sud (in collaboration with Jean-Paul Benoit), Spès, 1963, coll. Jamboree
 Les murs de la ville, éditions Hachette, 1975, coll. Poche Rouge
 Vorstadtsommer : Bruno, Mike und Rocandos (traduction de Thomas Münster), Freiburg im Breisgau, Basel, Wien : Herder, 1979

As Carlo Nada 
 La bataille du quartier, Signe de Piste, NSDP 53, 1977

As André Jouly 
 Le Prince Milou, Spès, 1957, coll. Jamboree

As Jacques Van Herp

Anthologies 
 Sur l'autre face du monde et autres romans scientifiques de sciences et voyages (in collaboration with Gérard Klein, Robert Laffont, 1973, coll. Ailleurs et Demain/Classiques)
 l'Angleterre fantastique (de Defoe à Wells, 22 contes de revenants et de terreur) (Éditions André Gérard, 1974, coll. Anthologies)
 Cahiers de l'Herne n° 38 : Jean Ray (in collaboration with François Truchaud, Herne, 1980, coll. Les cahiers de l'Herne, n° 38)
 Fritz Leiber, Les nouvelles, suivies d’une autobiographie (Lefrancq, 1988)

Essays, studies, guides  
 Panorama de la science-fiction (Éditions Gérard & C°, 1974, n° 270, coll. Marabout Université)
 Panorama de la science-fiction (1974-1996) (Lefrancq, coll. Volumes)
 Harry Dickson, le Sherlock Holmes américain Tome 1, Recto-verso, 1981
 Harry Dickson, le Sherlock Holmes américain Tome 2, Recto-verso, 1983

Short stories 
 Rencontre à minuit (1987, Phénix, n° 11)

As Michel Jansen

Novels 
 Raiders de l'espace (in collaboration with Jean Erland), Spès, 1955, coll. Jamboree
 Vers les espaces infinis, Editions du Soleil levant, 1956
 La porte sous les eaux (in collaboration with John Flanders), Spès, 1960, coll. Jamboree
 Mer des pluies - Spès 1961, coll. Jamboree-ainé
 Port des brumes, Signe de Piste, 1955 (SDP 74)

Short stories 
 Werewolf (1957, Fiction, n° 44)
 Excès de vitesse (1958, Fiction, n° 57)
 La fin du UB-65 (1969 Audace n° 1 - 15me année - Spécial Fantastique
 Poursuite sans fin (1986, Phénix, n° 4)
 De Du'Vel On à Nek (1988, Phénix, n° 15)
 Prima donna (dans la Première Anthologie de la science-fiction française, OPTA, 1959, coll. Fiction-Spécial)
 Si jamais je te pince (1987, Phénix, n° 8)

References

1923 births
2004 deaths
People from Brussels
Belgian publishers (people)
Belgian science fiction writers
Belgian writers in French